The Brightsand River is a river in the James Bay drainage basin in Unorganized Thunder Bay District in northwestern Ontario, Canada.

Most of the river is protected in the Brightsand River Provincial Park. The river's headwaters are protected in the Garden Pakashkan Conservation Reserve.

Geography
It flows north through Brightsand Lake and further to Wapakaimaski Lake. The river splits with one channel flowing west into Seseganaga Lake and further into Kawaweogama Lake; the other flows north through Antler Lake and McEwan Lake. The two combine again to form the river Allan Water at the community of Allanwater Bridge, the location of Allanwater Bridge railway station, served by Via Rail transcontinental Canadian trains, on the Canadian National Railway transcontinental main line.

Tributaries
Hilltop Creek (left)
Rude Creek (left)
Globe Creek (right)
Sparrow Creek (right)
Grid Creek (left)
Bluebird Creek (right)
Ermine Creek (left)
Aylsworth Creek (right)
Wawang River (left)
Pakashkan Lake (source)

Brightsand River Provincial Park

It was established in May 1989 to protect a recreational waterway that also provides an important link with other provincial parks and conservation areas.

The park is representative of a glaciated Precambrian landscape, with typical boreal forest. Notable aspects include a variety of interesting glacial features and 10 known rock art sites. It borders on the Upper English River Conservation Reserve to the west, Kopka River Provincial Park to the east, and Wabakimi Provincial Park to the north.

It is a non-operating park without any services. The only facilities include a total of 200 backcountry campsites. The park is used for recreational activities such as boating, canoeing, fishing, hiking, swimming, and hunting.

See also
List of rivers of Ontario

References

Rivers of Thunder Bay District